Richard Doughty (17 November 1960 – 6 February 2018) was an English cricketer. Primarily a bowler, he played for Gloucestershire between 1981 and 1984 and for Surrey between 1985 and 1987.

Following a period of severe depression and illness which led him to spend a month in the Sporting Chance Clinic, a specialist rehabilitation clinic set up by former England and Arsenal captain Tony Adams for sports men and women, Doughty re-trained as a counsellor and from 2006 worked with various professional sports associations and organisations to mentor and advise professional athletes with addictive or psychological issues.

Doughty spoke extensively on behalf of the Professional Cricketers' Association (who had helped fund his rehabilitation with the Sporting Chance Clinic) and featured heavily in their Health and Wellbeing programme. Doughty also worked with The Prince's Trust mentoring children who were experiencing difficulties including bullying.

References

External links

1960 births
2018 deaths
English cricketers
Gloucestershire cricketers
Surrey cricketers
People from Bridlington
Sportspeople from Yorkshire